What Love Has Taught Us is the second studio album by Taiwanese singer-songwriter Eric Chou, released by Sony Music Taiwan on 8 August 2016. Pre-orders for the album began on 22 July. The album contains 10 songs, all composed by Chou, including the hit, "How Have You Been?" which topped the KKBOX Mandarin Weekly Singles Chart for 30 consecutive weeks, and its music video reaching 185 million views as of July 2022. Chou worked with producers Daniel Bi and Starr Chen to strengthen the album's sense of rhythm and to incorporate R&B elements.

Background and release 
In 2016, Chou served as a composer for the Chinese television series Magical Space-Time, writing three songs including "Back to the Day" which was performed by himself, and was used for as the theme song of the drama. The song will eventually appear on his then upcoming album. A year and eight months after the release of his successful debut studio album My Way to Love, Chou released the first official single off of his new album, "How Have You Been?" According to Chou, he was walking in the park with his dog, Chopin, when he noticed a patch of green illuminated by sunlight, and a melody immediately flashed through his mind. He started working on the melody when he got home and pointed the 2015 film Brooklyn as one of the inspirations for the song. He also wrote the song for his late grandmother who passed away shortly after his debut.

On 8 August 2016, Chou officially released his second studio album, What Love Has Taught Us.

Track listing

References 

2016 albums
Eric Chou albums